Kazdanga Parish is an administrative unit of South Kurzeme Municipality, Latvia.

Villages of Kazdanga parish 

 Bojas
 Cildi
 Kannenieki
 Kapši
 Kazdanga
 Mazbojas
 Rokaiži
 Tebras
 Valata
 Vecpils
 Ziemciems

See also 
 Kazdanga palace
 Boja Manor

References 

Parishes of Latvia
South Kurzeme Municipality
Courland